Sammy Sosa Softball Slam is a baseball video game developed and published by The 3DO Company in 2000. It is one of the games to feature then-Chicago Cubs right fielder Sammy Sosa on the cover, the other being Sammy Sosa High Heat Baseball 2001.

Reception

The PC version received mixed reviews, while the PlayStation version received unfavorable reviews, according to the review aggregation website GameRankings.

References

External links
 

2000 video games
Major League Baseball video games
North America-exclusive video games
PlayStation (console) games
The 3DO Company games
Video games based on real people
Video games developed in the United States
Windows games